Dick van Alphen (18 September 1938 – 21 May 2009) was an Australian soccer player.

Club career
Van Alphen played for the Amsterdam team De Volewijckers in his native Holland before he emigrated to Australia in 1960. He played for Ringwood Wilhelmina, Melbourne Hakoah and Caulfield City.

International career
Van Alphen made his debut for Australia against New Zealand in 1967 and earned a total of 9 caps for the Socceroos.

References

External links

1938 births
2009 deaths
Van Alphen, Dick
Van Alphen, Dick
Dutch emigrants to Australia
Naturalised citizens of Australia
Dutch footballers 
Ringwood City SC players
AVV De Volewijckers players
Eerste Divisie players
Association football defenders